Bernd Fleckeisen is an East German sprint canoer who competed in the early 1980s. He won two medals at the 1981 ICF Canoe Sprint World Championships  in Nottingham with a silver in the K-2 1000 m and a bronze in the K-2 500 m events.

References

German male canoeists
Living people
Year of birth missing (living people)
ICF Canoe Sprint World Championships medalists in kayak